Nanliang is a town of Yicheng County, Shanxi, China. , it has one residential community and 30 villages under its administration.

References

Township-level divisions of Shanxi
Yicheng County